This article lists the members of the Parliament of Finland from 2019 to 2023. The 38th Parliament of Finland follows the parliamentary election held on 14 April 2019. There are 200 MPs in the Parliament.

As elected

Midterm replacements
 Jussi Halla-Aho (Finns Party) was substituted by Mika Raatikainen from 23 April 2019 to 2 July 2019.
 Merja Kyllönen (Left Alliance) was substituted by Risto Kalliorinne from 23 April 2019 to 2 July 2019.
 Teuvo Hakkarainen (Finns Party) was replaced by Toimi Kankaanniemi on 2 July 2019.
 Laura Huhtasaari (Finns Party) was replaced by Petri Huru on 2 July 2019.
 Antti Rantakangas (Centre Party) was replaced by Tuomas Kettunen on 28 November 2019.
 Jutta Urpilainen (SDP) was replaced by Matias Mäkynen on 3 December 2019.
 Paavo Arhinmäki (Left Alliance) was replaced by Suldaan Said Ahmed on 9 September 2021.

References

External links
Current Members of Parliament in the database of the Parliament of Finland

2019